Arminas Narbekovas (born 28 January 1965 in Gargždai) is a former Lithuanian football player. In 2003, he was selected by UEFA as his country's Golden Player, the greatest player of the past 50 years.

Personal life
Arminas Narbekovas was born to a Tatar father Andrey Narbekov and a Lithuanian mother.

Career
Narbekovas made his debut in 1983 with Žalgiris Vilnius, Lithuania's sole representative in the Soviet Top League, at the age of 18. In 1987, he finished second in league scoring with 16 goals while leading his club to a third-place finish, their best in history. Zalgiris would then participate in the UEFA Cup for the first time, losing to Austria Vienna. Austria would become Narbekovas' destination after Lithuanian players were allowed to move abroad. Arminas moved there in 1990 after a short stint with Lokomotiv Moscow, since Lithuania was not a part of UEFA yet and players from its clubs were not permitted to transfer. Narbekovas would spend the rest of his club career in Austria, with Austria Vienna until 1995 and then with Admira Wacker and a number of other lower division clubs.

International career
Although he never received a FIFA-sanctioned cap for the USSR national team, he did play for them, and win the gold medal, at the 1988 Summer Olympics. Narbekovas scored two goals in the tournament, including an extra time one in the semifinals against Italy, helping the Soviets to a 3–2 victory. Also, he represented USSR in 1987 Summer Universiade. Arminas first played for Lithuania in its first ever game as a newly independent country, on 27 May 1990 against Georgia, and scored the first goal in the 2–2 tie. Unfortunately, injuries limited his career to just 13 caps and four goals for his country.

Honours

Club
Austria Wien
Austrian Football Bundesliga (3): 1990–91, 1991–92, 1992–93 
Austrian Cup (2): 1991–92, 1993–94

International
Summer Olympic Games
Gold medal: 1988
Universiade
Gold medal: 1987

Individual
Lithuanian Player of the Year: 1985, 1986, 1987, 1988
 UEFA Jubilee Awards Lithuanian Golden Player representative
 Summer Universiade: 1987 top scorer

International goals

Lithuania

Soviet Union Olympic team

Honours
Narbekovas was named Lithuania's footballer of the year four times, from 1985 to 1988. In November 2003, to celebrate UEFA's jubilee, he was selected by the Lithuanian Football Federation as the country's Golden Player – the greatest player of the last 50 years.

References

External links
 

Lithuanian footballers
Lithuania international footballers
UEFA Golden Players
FK Žalgiris players
FK Žalgiris managers
Soviet footballers
Soviet expatriate footballers
Soviet Top League players
FC Lokomotiv Moscow players
Olympic footballers of the Soviet Union
Footballers at the 1988 Summer Olympics
Olympic gold medalists for the Soviet Union
Expatriate footballers in Austria
Soviet expatriate sportspeople in Austria
Lithuanian expatriate sportspeople in Austria
FK Austria Wien players
FC Admira Wacker Mödling players
1965 births
Living people
Olympic medalists in football
People from Gargždai
Medalists at the 1988 Summer Olympics
Association football midfielders
Lithuanian football managers
FK Atlantas managers
FK Banga Gargždai managers
Lithuanian people of Russian descent
Volga Tatar people